John Edward McCarthy (June 21, 1930 – August 18, 2018) was an American prelate of the Roman Catholic Church.  He served as bishop of the Diocese of Austin in Texas from 1985 to 2001.

Biography

Early life
John McCarthy was born on June 21, 1930, in Houston, Texas, to George McCarthy and Grace O'Brien McCarthy. The youngest of four children, he was just 18 months old when his father died.  His mother struggled to support her family in the midst of the Great Depression.

McCarthy suffered an appendicitis at the age of five and nearly died.  That led to three abdominal surgeries the following year and he was kept away from contact sports by his mother following doctor's advice.  An avid learner, he picked up world geography and followed the progress of World War II armies at his mother's kitchen table. Although he fell behind in athletics, his brother, Frank, remembers, "in the classroom, he was untouchable, a straight-A student".

During the World War II, prices soared and the family faced greater difficulty than during the depression.  He and his brothers took jobs to help.  During his high school years, McCarthy worked in a downtown Houston petroleum statistics office, running a multi-lift printing press.  He also started his own janitorial service which had three employees.

McCarthy attended primary school at All Saints School in Houston Heights.  He graduated from St. Thomas High School in Houston and earned a Bachelor of Arts degree in economics and sociology from the University of St. Thomas in Houston in 1956.  He began his seminary training at St. Mary Seminary in Wickliffe, Ohio.  He was awarded a Master of Theology degree from the University of St. Thomas in 1979.

Priesthood 
McCarthy was ordained to the priesthood on May 25, 1956, for the Diocese of Galveston.  His first assignment was St. Pius Parish in Pasadena, Texas where he initiated his first parish social ministry program.  His next parish was St. Cecilia's in an affluent section of Houston.  His third assignment was his home parish, All Saints.  After several non-parish assignments in San Antonio and Washington D.C., McCarthy returned to Houston to become pastor of St. Theresa's. Parish  It was here that he developed his ideas for the parish social ministry model.  This "Sisters in Social Services" program was adopted by Catholic Charities USA.

In 1966, McCarthy was appointed executive director of the Bishops' Committee for Spanish-speaking Catholics in San Antonio, where he focused on migrant farm workers.  In 1966, McCarthy went to Washington, D.C. and worked with the U.S. Catholic Conference.  He served as the director of the Social Action Department for one year and director of the Division for Poverty Programs for another year.  He also helped found the Catholic Campaign for Human Development, which became the Catholic leadership's primary anti-poverty initiative, hammering out the initial concepts at a weekend retreat.  Its mandate included voter registration, community-run schools, minority-owned and rural cooperatives, and job training programs.

In 1973, the bishops of Texas asked McCarthy to be the executive director of the Texas Catholic Conference (TCC), the public policy arm of the bishops.  At that time Texas had eleven dioceses and was the largest state conference in the nation.  He enjoyed the diversity of the role, once contrasting the differences between El Paso and Beaumont.  He led the TCC for seven years before being appointed auxiliary bishop.

Auxiliary Bishop of Galveston-Houston
On January 23, 1979, Pope John Paul II appointed McCarthy as an auxiliary bishop of the Diocese of Galveston-Houston.  He was consecrated on March 14, 1979, by Bishop John Morkovsky.

Bishop of Austin
On December 24, 1985, McCarthy was appointed by John Paul II as bishop of the Diocese of Austin and installed on February 26, 1986.  He served for 15 years.

In 1987, McCarthy attended the National Black Catholic Congress. After returning to Austin, he established the Office of Black Catholics to focus on African American ministry within the diocese. McCarthy encouraged parishes to focus on their social advocacy and charity work. He also established missionary programs both abroad and at home.  McCarthy established the Diocesan Law Project, which recruited hundreds of attorneys and interpreters to volunteer legal services for the needy.

McCarthy issued two pastoral letters to people in the Diocese of Austin  His 1992 letter asked Catholics to practice compassion for people living with HIV/AIDS.  His 1993  letter cited the "tragic collapse of standards of decency, morality and honesty in TV, movie and popular music products."  His letter urged Catholics to question themselves, what values were being instilled by the popular media.

Retirement and legacy 
Pope John Paul II accepted McCarthy's resignation letter of resignation as bishop of the Diocese of Austin on Jan 2, 2001.John McCarthy died at his Austin home on August 18, 2018, at age 88.

At the time of his death, McCarthy was a member of St. Teresa's Parish of Austin. His burial Mass was held at St. William Catholic Church in Round Rock, Texas and attended by 1,200 people. Pat Hayes of Seton Healthcare Network and St. Edward's University, summarized McCarthy's philosophy.  "He believed, that together we could advance justice for the common good."

A 2019 report by KXAN in Austin revealed that in 1994 McCarthy transferred a priest accused of sexual abuse crimes to another parish.  The report cited documents from a 2003 lawsuit that indicated McCarthy was fully aware of multiple allegations against James O’Connor, a diocese priest.  In a 1994 letter, to O'Connor, McCarthy said that he was appointing him as administrator of St. Thomas Parish in Hamilton, Texas, despite many misgivings: “I am not comfortable placing you in charge of a parish, even a small one, but in order to give you a base for a few months while you rethink your situation, I am happy to go against my better judgment on the basis of Christian charity.

Positions

Parish social ministry model 
McCarthy believed that the purpose of a parish is to "make Jesus present".  He broke that down into three areas; worship, teaching and lessening pain.  Although every parish had organized programs on worship and education, his concern was they did not always have any structures to address local social needs.  He created the first organized parish social ministries.  Its goal was for every parish to establish a program for social concerns.

As a young pastor at St. Pius Parish in Houston in 1969, McCarthy began implementing this model of social ministry, articulating how social services should be delivered. His model was based on parishes developing their own programs to meet the needs of those living within parish boundaries.While pastor of St. Theresa's he continued to develop the parish social ministry model.  His parish social ministry model spread throughout the Galveston Diocese.  Eventually this "Sisters in Social Services" model was adopted by Catholic Charities USA.

Social justice 
Self described as "slightly tilted toward the left", McCarthy was known for his efforts supporting civil rights, helping workers, increasing minority inclusion in the church and abolishing the death penalty. As a young priest, McCarthy took part in protests to advance civil rights for African-Americans and other people.

"He marched in Selma," said Luci Baines Johnson."So the Great Society programs my father had in civil rights, these are the causes that were dear to the heart of a young priest." McCarthy supported the United Farm Workers movement led by Cesar Chavez.

When the National Conference of Catholic Bishops committee released a statement calling for Catholic parents to embrace their gay and lesbian children, McCarthy praised their action. He used his influence with the Texas Legislature and individual Catholic lawmakers to reform the criminal justice system.  He made the case to abolish the death penalty years before DNA testing was available to prove innocence.  He was known to pressure decision makers at the Texas State Capitol over the issue.

McCarthy permitted the local city hospital run by Catholic-affiliated Seton hospital, to perform tubal ligations.  This conflicted with church law on birth control and at the behest of the Vatican this was discontinued.

McCarthy recognized the centrality of the priesthood as the organizing tool of the church.  He said the priest makes the sacraments possible, which make Jesus Christ present. Since he wanted to build new, smaller communities, it would require more priests.  To that end he wrote letters to his fellow U.S. and Texas bishops and to the Vatican on the issue of priestly celibacy.  He urged them to respond to what he saw as a looming crisis and consider optional celibacy, suggesting allowing priests to marry.  In a 2013 interview he said "It might mean woman priests."  He suggested that even if a priest couldn't be available full-time, perhaps a nun could act as pastor to a smaller parish.

Blog and book 
After his retirement Jan. 2, 2001, McCarthy wrote a blog and had numerous hobbies. In 2013, he published a collection of his blog writings in a book, "Off the Cuff and Over the Collar: Common Sense Catholicism".

See also
 

 Catholic Church hierarchy
 Catholic Church in the United States
 Historical list of the Catholic bishops of the United States
 List of Catholic bishops of the United States
 Lists of patriarchs, archbishops, and bishops

References

External links
Bishop John McCarthy - A Bishop's blog
Roman Catholic Diocese of Austin

Episcopal succession

1930 births
2018 deaths
20th-century Roman Catholic bishops in the United States
People from Houston
University of St. Thomas (Texas) alumni
American Roman Catholic clergy of Irish descent
Catholics from Texas